Dehdez (also Romanized as Dehdaz and Deh-e Dez; also known as Deh Diz) is a city and capital of Dehdez District, in Izeh County, Khuzestan Province, Iran.  At the 2006 census its population was 3,610, with 651 households.

Climate
Dehdez has a Mediterranean-influenced humid continental climate (Köppen: "Dsa"), with cold winters, hot summers, and mild springs and autumns.

References

Populated places in Izeh County

Cities in Khuzestan Province